Hua Hin Market Village is a shopping mall in Hua Hin, Prachuap Khiri Khan Province, Thailand. The first large-scale shopping and entertainment complex in the beach resort town, it opened in February 2006.

Anchor
 Lotus's
 Food Court
 Homepro
 The Power
 Major Cineplex 4 Cinemas
 B2S
 Supersports

See also
 List of shopping malls in Thailand

References

External links
 

2006 establishments in Thailand
Buildings and structures in Prachuap Khiri Khan province
Shopping malls established in 2006
Shopping malls in Thailand